The Saint Augustine Altarpiece was a mixed-technique 1454-1469 panel painting by Piero della Francesca, now split up and dispersed. It had at least ten panels, not including a probable predella (now completely lost) or other panels (also completely lost). Eight panels survive.

History
It is the artist's third known major altarpiece, following his Polyptych of the Misericordia (c.1444-1464) and Polyptych of Perugia (c.1460-1470). It was intended for the church of Sant'Agostino (now rededicated as Santa Chiara) in Sansepolcro. The Augustinians there signed a contract with the artist on 4 October 1454, with Angelo di Giovanni di Simone d'Angelo's signature and that of the artist. He received the last payment on 14 November 1469.

The Augustinians probably took the incomplete work with them when they moved out of the church. It was then completed in its new location before being broken into pieces, possibly during the 1550s century. Separate panels at least came into private hands in the early 16th century. In the first half of the 19th century the main panels of the work were in Milan, as shown by wax stamps on their reverses authorising their export from Austrian Lombardy and also the seals of a number of collectors from Milan. Towards the end of the 19th century the panels appeared as separate lots at an art dealership, leading them to be split between a number of mainly private collections, which later passed to their present public collections or institutions.

Main register
To the right of St Michael and to the left of St John can be seen traces of the throne from the lost central panel, Madonna and Child.

Upper register
Between Monica and Crucifixion was another saint, now lost.

Possible reconstruction

References

Paintings by Piero della Francesca
1460s paintings
Paintings in the collection of the National Museum of Ancient Art
Polyptychs
Paintings in the Frick Collection
Paintings in the collection of the Museo Poldi Pezzoli
Collections of the National Gallery, London
Collections of the National Gallery of Art
Piero
Piero
Piero
Piero
Books in art
Piero